Cartridge is a surname in the English language, and is considered to be an English surname. The name is thought to be possibly a variant form of the surname Cartwright. According to etymologist P. H. Reaney, the earliest record of the surname Cartridge is of John Carkerege, in 1522 (in Canterbury). The surname Cartwright is derived from two Middle English elements: cart, carte + wright, meaning "craftsman". The name is first recorded in the 13th century, although the vocabulary word does not date before the 15th century. According to Reaney, the earliest record of the surname Cartwright is of John le Cartwereste, in 1275 (within the Subsidy Rolls of Worcestershire).

People with the surname
Donald Cartridge (1933–2016), English cricketer

References

English-language surnames